The Oluwa Forest Reserve is located in Ondo State, Nigeria, and covers over . It is part of the Omo-Shasha-Oluwa forest reserves, although it has become separated from the Omo and Shasha reserves (which are still connected as of 2011). The three reserves contain some of the last remaining forest in the area. Although they are biologically unique, they are threatened by logging, hunting and agriculture.

2007 Nigerian Conservation Foundation report
In 2007, British Gas commissioned the Nigerian Conservation Foundation to report on the feasibility of its proposed protected area in the three reserves. Among the report's findings were:

40 percent of the natural forest in the reserves remains.
Elephants and chimpanzees still inhabit the area.

Its recommendations were:

All logging, hunting, farming and human settlement should stop.
Two protected areas should be established: Western Omo/Shasha and Oluwa.
The area connecting the Omo and Shasha forests near Etemi should be allowed to regrow.
Management plans should be implemented for the area.

See also
Shasha Forest Reserve

References

 Oke, C.O. 2013. Terrestrial mollusc species richness and diversity in Omo Forest Reserve, Ogun State, Nigeria. African Invertebrates 54 (1): 93–104.

Forest Reserves of Nigeria